In the 2002–03 season, Shelbourne finished 2nd in the League of Ireland Premier Division.

Managerial/backroom staff 

Manager: Pat Fenlon

2002–03 squad members 

 (Captain)

Results/league tables

eircom League Premier Division

Final league table

League Results summary

League Form/Results by Round

UEFA Champions League

First Qualifying Round 

Hibernians won 3 – 2 on aggregate

FAI Cup

Second round

Third round

2002–03 season statistics

Player appearances/goals 

As of 24 January 2003.

|}

Top goalscorers

References 

Shelbourne F.C. seasons
Shelbourne
2002–03 League of Ireland Premier Division